Cheongdam-dong 111 is a reality show aired by South Korean television channel tvN between November 21, 2013 and January 9, 2014 about the daily life and inner workings of FNC Entertainment, a record label and talent agency. The title of the show reflects the agency's location in Cheongdam-dong, Gangnam-gu, Seoul.

Story
The show is based on the format of reality shows, however it is not completely live. Real events that previously happened at the agency are dramatized. Dialogues and characters, however, are real.

Cast
 Members of F.T. Island 
 Members of CNBLUE 
 Members of AOA
 Members of N.Flying 
 Juniel
 Han Seung-ho, CEO
 Kim Yeong-seon, director responsible for artists

References

South Korean reality television series
2013 South Korean television series debuts
2014 South Korean television series endings
TVN (South Korean TV channel) original programming
FNC Entertainment
Television series by Signal Entertainment Group